Harry Archibald 'Slippery' Eells (February 14, 1881 – December 7, 1940) was a Major League Baseball pitcher who played for one season for the Cleveland Naps. He pitched in 14 games for the Naps during the 1906 season.

References

External links

1881 births
1940 deaths
Major League Baseball pitchers
Cleveland Naps players
Minor league baseball managers
Springfield Reds players
Oakland Heeseman players
Joplin Miners players
Oakland Oaks (baseball) players
Seattle Siwashes players
Kansas City Blues (baseball) players
Toledo Mud Hens players
Baseball players from California